The Midlander may refer to:

The Midlander (Queensland Rail), former train service operated by Queensland Rail
The Midlander (Western Australian Government Railways), former train service operated by the Western Australian Government Railways
The Midlanders, 1920 silent drama film